Tower G, or simply Tower Palace Three, is a 73-floor luxury residential skyscraper in Seoul, South Korea. The structure was originally designed to be 93 stories high, but was later scaled down due to zoning rights imposed by city regulations. A notable feature of this structure is the implementation of the Y-shaped tripartite floor geometry which maximizes views and floor space. This innovation pioneered the way for the development of the buttressed core, which is used in the floor plan of the Burj Khalifa as a result of its potential application in megatall skyscrapers. It was the tallest building in the country in 2004 but was surpassed in height by the Northeast Asia Trade Tower in Incheon when it was topped out in 2009. It was designed by United States-based architectural firm Skidmore, Owings and Merrill.

Its shape is formed by three oval lobes joined together. It is the eighth-tallest all-residential building in the world.

See also
Korean architecture
Samsung Tower Palace

References

External links
Tower Palace III at Skidmore, Owings, & Merrill
Tower Palace 3 Tower G at SkyscraperPage
Tower Palace 3, Tower G at Emporis

Skyscrapers in Seoul
Skidmore, Owings & Merrill buildings
2004 establishments in South Korea
Residential skyscrapers in South Korea
Residential buildings completed in 2004